The Canadian Screen Award Award for Best Direction in a Children's or Youth Program or Series is a Canadian Screen Award that honours direction in English language children's television produced in Canada.

Winners and nominees 
Winners in bold.

2000s

2003
  Bruce McDonald - Degrassi: The Next Generation ("Weird Science")
 Stefan Scaini - Strange Days at Blake Holsey High ("Culture")
 Anthony Atkins - Edgemont ("Friday Night's All Right")
 Grant Harvey - Mentors ("Remembrance")
 Jessica Bradford - When I Was Seven

2004
  Philip Earnshaw - Degrassi: The Next Generation ("Pride")
 Michael Fallows - Miss Spider's Sunny Patch Kids
 Don McBrearty - Mrs. Ashboro's Cat
 Chuck Rubin - Poko ("Poko on the Moon") 
 Martin Wood - The Impossible Elephant

2005
  Graeme Campbell - Instant Star ("You Can't Always Get What You Want")
 Jeffrey Agala, Ridd Sorenson, and Mauro Casalese - Atomic Betty ("Atomic Roger/Toxic Talent")
 Robert de Lint - renegadepress.com ("Dying to Connect")
 Robert Higden, Richard Mortimer, and Sid Goldberg - Surprise! It's Edible Incredible! (""Matthew and Jordan")
 J. J. Johnson - This Is Daniel Cook ("This is Daniel Cook Doing Magic...")

2006
  Paolo Barzman - 15/Love ("Volley of the Dolls")
 Ron Murphy - Dark Oracle ("TrailBLAZE")
 Philip Marcus - Dragon ("Dragon Runs the Store")
 Jamie Whitney - If The World Were a Village
 Stan Gadziola, Chuck Rubin, and Brian Duchschere - Poko ("Poko & Bibi of the Arctic")

2007
  Joseph Sherman - Johnny Test ("Saturday Night's Alright for Johnny/Johnny's Mint Chip")
 Graeme Campbell - Instant Star ("I Fought the Law")
 Pat Williams - Instant Star ("Personality Crisis")
 Rick Marshall - Peep and the Big Wide World ("Dry Duck")
 Robert Cohen - The Great Canadian Polar Bear Adventure

2008
  Robert Daniel Pytlyk - Drug Class ("Travis' Story")
 Philip Earnshaw - Degrassi: The Next Generation ("Standing in the Dark, Part 1")
 Graeme Campbell - Instant Star ("Celebrity Skin")
 Jeff Beesley - renegadepress.com ("Cyber Sandbox")
 Steve Diguer - Tumbletown Tales ("Secret Rodent Club")

2009
  Eleanore Lindo - Degrassi: The Next Generation ("Fight the Power")
 Pat Williams - Instant Star ("Us and Them")
 Michael Mabbott - Life with Derek ("March Break")
 René Dowhaniuk - The Next Star ("The Duet")
 Alex Khan - Think Big ("Getting It Right")

2010s

2010
  Stefan Brogren - Degrassi: The Next Generation ("Beat It, Part 2")
 Philip Earnshaw - Degrassi: The Next Generation ("Just Can't Get Enough, Part 2")
 Craig Pryce - Family Biz ("Shake the Box")
 John May - How to Be Indie ("How to Trick Your Parents into Treating you Like a Grown Up")
 Liz Haines - The Ocean Room ("Shorter Circuits")

2011
  Pat Williams - Degrassi ("All Falls Down, Part 2")
 Philip Earnshaw - Degrassi: The Next Generation ("My Body is a Cage, Part 2")
 J. J. Johnson - Dino Dan ("Where the Dinosaurs Are")
 William Gordon - Pirates: Adventures in Art ("Yo Ho Shadow")
 Mitchell Ness - Wingin' It ("Hold the Dressing")

2012
  Phil Earnshaw - Degrassi ("Scream" part 2)
 Derby Crewe - Wingin' It ("Friday Afternoon Fever")
 Neill Fearnley - The Haunting Hour ("Lights Out")
 Brian Roberts - My Babysitter's A Vampire ("Three Geeks And A Demon")
 Nadine Schwartz - run run revolution

2013
  Stefan Brogren - Degrassi ("Time of My Life")
 Randall "RT!" Thorne - ALIVE
 Jesse Shamata and Rae Upton - The Grizzly Cup ("Part 1")
 Samir Rehem - The Next Step ("Sabotage")
 Derby Crewe - Wingin' It ("Live and Let Fly")

2014
  Phil Earnshaw - Degrassi ("Hypnotize")
 John Payne and Lynn Reist - Franklin and Friends ("Franklin and the Four Seasons")
 Allan Harmon - If I Had Wings
 Neill Fearnley - R.L. Stine's The Haunting Hour ("Brush With Madness")
 J. J. Johnson - This is Scarlett and Isaiah ("This is Isaiah Helping with the First Day of School")

2015
  Phil Earnshaw - Degrassi ("Finally" part 2)
 J. J. Johnson - Annedroids ("New Pals")
 Jesse Shamata - Gaming Show (In My Parents' Garage) ("All Night Long")
 Craig Wallace - Odd Squad ("The One That Got Away")
 Stefan Brogren - Open Heart ("Last Things First")

2016
  Eleanor Lindo - Degrassi: Next Class ("#ThisCouldBeUsButYouPlayin")
 Zsolt Luka - The Mystery Files ("The Mystery Behind the Mask")
 J. J. Johnson - Odd Squad ("The First Day")
 Stefan Scaini - Odd Squad ("Failure to Lunch")
 Ryan Marley - Science Max: Experiments at Large ("How You Build It")

2017
 John Kent Harrison, L.M. Montgomery's Anne of Green Gables: Fire & Dew
J. J. Johnson, Odd Squad: "The Cherry On-Top-Inator/Sir"
Derby Crewe, The Next Step: "A New Regime"
Graeme Lynch, Cheer Squad: "Three-peat?"
J. J. Johnson, Dino Dana: "Mega Tooth"

2018
 J. J. Johnson, Odd Squad: "World Turned Odd, Pt. 1"
Derby Crewe, The Next Step: "Coup d'état"
J. J. Johnson, Dino Dana: "A Dino Never Forgets / Claw and Order" 
Mitchell T. Ness, The Next Step: "No Shell"
Ryan Marley, Science Max: "Gravity Boat"

2019
 Megan Follows, Holly Hobbie: "The Freckled Fugitive"
Stefan Brogren, Holly Hobbie: "The Birthday Basher"
J. J. Johnson, Dino Dana: "Dino Zone"
Gloria Ui Young Kim and Sharon Lewis, It's My Party!: "Winter Solstice"
Bruce McDonald, Creeped Out: "The Unfortunate Five"

2020s

2020
 Warren P. Sonoda, Odd Squad Mobile Unit: "Music of Sound"
Stefan Brogren, Holly Hobbie: "The Salty Songstress"
Bruce McDonald, Malory Towers: "The Spider"
Jasmin Mozaffari, Holly Hobbie: "The Puzzled Peacemaker"
R. T. Thorne, Utopia Falls: "I Can Kick It"

References 

Direction children